Henrik Høhling Holtermann (born 23 March 1997 in Ballerup) is a Danish curler.

At the national level, he is a three-time Danish junior champion curler (2016, 2017, 2018).

Teams

Men's

Mixed

Mixed doubles

References

External links

 Team Henrik Høhling Holtermann - Dansk Curling Forbund
 
 
 
 
 
 

Living people
1998 births
People from Ballerup
Danish male curlers
Curlers at the 2022 Winter Olympics
Olympic curlers of Denmark
Danish curling champions

Sportspeople from the Capital Region of Denmark
21st-century Danish people